A puzzle is a type of mental challenge. 

Jigsaw puzzles are a type of puzzle.

An economic puzzle is where the implication of theory is inconsistent with observed economic data.

A puzzle video game is a video game genre.

Puzzle or The Puzzle may also refer to:

Film
 Puzzle (1974 film), an Italian film
 Puzzle (1978 film), an Australian television film
 Puzzle (2006 film), a Korean film
 Puzzle (2010 film), an Argentine film
 Puzzle (2014 film), a Japanese film
 Puzzle (2018 film), an American film
 Puzzle (Narnia), a character in C.S. Lewis' Chronicles of Narnia

Music

Artists
 Puzzle (artist), electropop artist based in London, UK
 The Puzzle (band), Hungarian indie rock band
 Puzzle, a solo project by Fletcher Shears

Albums
 Puzzle (Biffy Clyro album), the 2007 fourth album by Scottish group Biffy Clyro
 Puzzle (Dada album), the 1992 debut album by the rock band dada
 Puzzle (Gianna Nannini album), the 1986 album by Gianna Nannini
 Puzzle (Amiina album), 2010 album by Amiina
 Puzzle (Kanjani Eight album), by the Japanese boy band Kanjani Eight
 The Puzzle, a 2021 album by Devin Townsend, released as The Puzzle / Snuggles
 Puzzle 1999 album by the pop band Tahiti 80
 The Puzzle, 2016 album by Dark Sarah

Songs
Puzzle (Mai Kuraki song)
 "Puzzle" (CNBLUE song), a 2016 song by CNBLUE
 "Puzzle", a 2014 song by Fernando Milagros
 "Puzzle", a 2017 song by Band-Maid from Just Bring It
"Puzzle", a 2017 song by Loona from Choerry

See also
 Thomas Samuel Kuhn's concept of normal science regards science as a process of "puzzle-solving"